The Mirzapur stele inscription, also called the Mirjāpur stele inscription, is a dedicatory inscription  on a large stone slab discovered in the Mirzapur area of Mathura which mentions the erection of a water tank by Mulavasu and his consort Kausiki, during the reign of the Sodasa, the Indo-Scythian Northern Satrap ruler of Mathura, assuming the title of "Svami (Lord) Mahakshatrapa (Great Satrap)".

Inscription
The stele bears a five line epigraph mentioning the dedication. The text is as follows :

Reign of Sodasa
The rule of Sodasa at the time of the erection of the stele is clearly mentioned, as are his titles "Lord Great Satrap":

References

Mathura art
Sanskrit inscriptions in India